Love Ranch is a 2010 American drama film directed by Taylor Hackford and starring Helen Mirren, Joe Pesci, Sergio Peris-Mencheta, Gina Gershon and Bryan Cranston. It was written by Mark Jacobson.

The film is based on the lives of Joe Conforte and Sally Conforte, a married couple who operated the first legal brothel in the United States after the widespread criminalization of prostitution in the US earlier in the 20th century, the Mustang Ranch in Storey County, Nevada, Violence results when their marriage is tested by infidelity. The story also alludes to the mysterious circumstances surrounding the assassination of famous Argentinian boxer Ringo Bonavena in the Mustang Ranch.

Plot synopsis
 
Charlie Bontempo (sometimes called Charlie "Goodtimes") and his wife, Grace, run a legal brothel known as the Love Ranch on a large, remote property near Reno, Nevada. Grace's mother had been a prostitute, so Grace knew the business, but it was Charlie who persuaded her to open a brothel in a part of Nevada where doing so would not be violating the law. The business runs smoothly but is not without its headaches, such as unruly customers needing to be dealt with by a bouncer or prostitutes who get out of line. Grace is amazed when Charlie procures the contract of a professional heavyweight boxer, Armando "Bruza" Bonavena, who is from Argentina and has had fights against the likes of Muhammad Ali and Joe Frazier.

Charlie is eager to have a fighter, but coaxes Grace into becoming Bruza's actual manager because Charlie has a felony conviction that prevents him from getting a license. Grace can hardly believe Bruza is willing to live and train at the brothel, where he moves into a trailer. She is surprised even more when Bruza begins to demonstrate a physical interest in her, since she is married and considerably older. She is offended at first, but the boxer's attentions and outgoing personality begin to win her over. Bruza begins to voice an interest in becoming Grace's business partner in running the brothel. Charlie begins to become aware of what's happening behind his back, leading to a disastrous outcome for all.

Cast
 Helen Mirren as Grace Bontempo
 Joe Pesci as Charlie "Charlie Goodtimes" Bontempo
 Sergio Peris-Mencheta as Armando Bruza
 Bryan Cranston as James Pettis
 Gina Gershon as Irene
 Scout Taylor-Compton as Christina
 Taryn Manning as Mallory
 Gil Birmingham as Sheriff Cortez
 Bai Ling as Samantha 
 Rick Gomez as Tom Macy
 Leslie Jordan as Mr. Hainsworth
 M. C. Gainey as Warren Stamp
 Elise Neal as Alana
 Harve Presnell as Dr. Smathers (in his final film role)
 Wendell Pierce as Naasih Mohammed

Production and release
Filming began in Reno, Nevada, in January 2008.

Love Ranch was released in limited U.S. theaters on June 30, 2010. It was Harve Presnell's final film role.

Reception
The film has received mostly negative reviews. On review aggregator website Rotten Tomatoes, the film holds an approval rating of 13% based on 52 reviews, and an average rating of 3.7/10. The website's critical consensus reads, "Despite its saucy setup and the always marvelous Helen Mirren, Love Ranch is disappointingly flaccid." On Metacritic, the film has a weighted average score of 37 out of 100, based on 23 critics, indicating "generally unfavorable reviews".

See also
 Oscar Bonavena – murdered real-life model for boxer Armando Bruza

References

External links
 
 
 
 Love Ranch, The Worst Little Whorehouse Movie in Nevada, Village Voice

2010 films
2010 drama films
American drama films
Films about prostitution in the United States
Films directed by Taylor Hackford
Films set in 1976
Films set in Nevada
Films shot in Nevada
American independent films
2010 independent films
2010s English-language films
2010s American films